"Oh Yeah" is a song by Australian rock band Taxiride. It was released as the first single from their third studio album, Axiomatic, in August 2005. It was their first independent release since leaving Warner Music Group in 2004. The track reached  40 in Australia.

Track listing
Maxi-CD single
 "Oh Yeah" – 4:11
 "Over My Head" – 5:25
 "Oh Yeah" (Super★ 7-inch remix) – 4:02
 "Oh Yeah" (Super★ 12-inch remix) – 6:44
 "Oh Yeah" (radio edit) – 3:46

Charts

References

2005 singles
2005 songs
Taxiride songs